The emblem of the Komi Autonomous Soviet Socialist Republic was adopted in 1938 by the government of the Komi Autonomous Soviet Socialist Republic. The emblem is identical to the emblem of the Russian Soviet Federative Socialist Republic.

History

First version 
The first emblem of the Komi ASSR was described in the first Constitution of the Komi ASSR, which was adopted by the Central Executive Committee of the Komi ASSR on 26 May 1937, at the 11th Extraordinary Congress of Soviets of the Komi ASSR. The emblem is described in Article 116 of the constitution :

The name of the republic is the same in both Russian and Komi, so there are only one inscription of the name of the ASSR in the emblem.

Second version 
On 1938, the writing system of the Komi language was changed. The Komi inscriptions on the emblem, which previously used Latin Molodtsov alphabet, was changed into Cyrillic letters.

Third version 
On May 23, 1978, the Extraordinary 8th Session of the Supreme Council of the 9th convocation of the Komi ASSR approved the new Constitution of the Komi ASSR. The emblem is now described in the Article 158 of the constitution :

There was minor changes on the emblem. A star was supplemented at the top of the emblem. The motto in the Komi language changed from "СТАВ СТРАНАЯССА ПРОЛЕТАРИЙЯС, OТУВТЧОЙ!" became "СТАВ МУВЫВСА ПРОЛЕТАРИЙЯС, OТУВТЧОЙ!".

The regulations on the emblem were approved by the Decree of the Presidium of the Supreme Council of the Komi ASSR on September 15, 1981.

Gallery

References

Citations

Bibliography 

Komi Autonomous Soviet Federative Socialist Republic
Komi ASSR
Komi ASSR
Komi ASSR
Komi ASSR
Komi ASSR